Tejuino is a cold fermented beverage made from corn and popularly consumed in the Mexican states of Jalisco and Chihuahua. Tejuino is usually made from corn dough, the same kind used for tortillas and tamales. The dough is mixed with water and piloncillo (cone-shaped unrefined cane sugar) and boiled until the liquid is very thick. The liquid is then allowed to ferment very slightly. The resulting drink is generally served cold, with lime juice, a pinch of salt and a scoop of shaved ice or lime sorbet.

Although the drink is strongly associated with the state of Jalisco, it is also commonly found in other parts of Mexico and more recently in Mexican American communities across Southwestern United States. In Mexico it is usually sold by street vendors in small plastic cups or in plastic bags tied around a straw. In the United States it can be found in Mexican juice bars.

Origin
The exact origin of Tejuino is disputed; however, most Mexicans agree that the drink dates back to pre-Columbian times. The ancient Nahua people of Mexico viewed Tejuino as the "drink of the gods" and it is still called this by some Mexicans today.

Variations
Within the state of Jalisco there are variations as to how it is served. In Puerto Vallarta, Jalisco, for example, tejuino is served without nieve de limon; in Guadalajara, Jalisco, it is usually served with nieve de limon, at the buyer's discretion. Nieve de limon is a homemade lime sorbet that is often added to the drink to bring out its natural flavor.

Alcohol content
Since tejuino is only allowed to ferment for a couple of days at most, the alcohol content is actually very low. There is a common myth among Mexicans that one can get drunk from drinking too much tejuino; however, this is usually due to the addition of small amounts of beer in some recipes rather than the alcohol content of the tejuino itself.

Gallery

See also 

 Amazake
 Boza
 List of maize dishes
 Malt beer
 Pozol
 Tepache
 Tesgüino
 Tiswin

References

Maize-based drinks
Mexican drinks
Fermented drinks
Mexican alcoholic drinks